The Vimy Award is an award presented by the Conference of Defence Associations Institute (CDA Institute) to the "Canadian who has made a significant and outstanding contribution to the defence and security of Canada and the preservation of (its) democratic values".  The "VIMY AWARD", a -scale statue of a World War I officer by André Gauthier, was commissioned for the CDA Institute.  The award, first presented in 1991, is given annually in November at a dinner held at the Canadian War Museum. The 2013 Vimy Award went to Brigadier-General Don Macnamara, a former President of the CDA Institute and member of the CDA Institute's Board of Directors; the CDA is the sponsor of the Vimy Award since 1991. The Award honours the bravery and sacrifices of the Canadian soldiers who were victorious at the Battle of Vimy Ridge in April 1917.

Past winners
Past recipients of the Vimy Award are:
1991 	Joe Clark, Right Honourable
1992 	John de Chastelain, General
1993 	Lewis MacKenzie, Major-General
1994 	William Howard, Major-General
1995 	Roméo Dallaire, Major-général
1996 	Jack Granatstein, Doctor
1997 	Brian Dickson, Right Honourable
1998 	Larry Murray, Vice-Admiral
1999 	Charles H. Belzile, Lieutenant-général
2000 	Barnett Danson, Right Honourable
2001 	Leonard Birchall, Air Commodore
2002 	John Allen Fraser, Colonel, the Honourable
2003 	Paul David Manson, General
2004 	David Bercuson, Doctor
2005 	Gordon Hamilton Southam
2006 	David Fraser, Brigadier-General
2007 	Ray Henault, General
2008	Rick Hillier, General
2009   William Kenneth MacDonald, Warrant Officer
2010   Adrienne Clarkson, Right Honourable
2011   Jonathan Vance, Major-General
2012   Federick Mannix, Honorary Colonel
2013   Don Macnamara, Brigadier-General (Ret’d)
2014   Blake Goldring, Honorary Colonel
2015   Hugh Segal, Senator
2016   James Boutilier, Doctor
2017   William Graham, Right Honourable
2018   Christine Whitecross, Lieutenant-General
2019   Richard Fadden, OC
2020   J.O. Michel Maisonneuve, Lieutenant-général

References

External links 
 

Canadian awards